Rider King Strong (born December 11, 1979) is an American actor, producer, director, and screenwriter. He is best known for starring as Shawn Hunter on the ABC sitcom Boy Meets World (1993–2000), which he reprised in its sequel series Girl Meets World (2014–2017). He also headlined the cult Cabin Fever (2002) and co-wrote and directed the independent film Irish Twins (2008) with his brother Shiloh. He provided the voices of Brick Flagg in Kim Possible (2002–2004) and Kim Possible Movie: So the Drama (2005), and Tom Lucitor in Star vs. the Forces of Evil (2015–2019). In 2015, Strong was honored with the Young Artist Former Child Star Lifetime Achievement Award.

Early life
Strong was born in San Francisco, California, the second of two boys born to Lin (née Warner), a teacher and nutritionist, and King Arthur Strong, a firefighter, who are both originally from Pennsylvania. He has English and Irish ancestry. He graduated from Nonesuch School in Sebastopol, California in 1998. His elder brother is Shiloh Strong, an actor and photographer.

Strong attended morning classes at Occidental College while still filming for Boy Meets World, accumulating a year's worth of credit before the series ended. In 2004, Strong graduated magna cum laude from Columbia University as an English major. He completed his Master of Fine Arts in fiction and literature in June 2009 at Bennington College.

Career

Strong began his acting career at the age of nine, when he starred as Gavroche in the San Francisco production of Les Misérables, alongside Larisa Oleynik as Young Cosette. After the stage production, he appeared in small screen roles on television. 

In 1992, he received his first regular television series role as Julie Andrews's son on Julie. When the series was canceled, Strong made his debut on film as Amy Irving's son in Benefit of the Doubt. It was not until he was chosen for the role of Shawn Hunter in the ABC series Boy Meets World that he received widespread recognition. During the seven-year run, he was nominated twice for the Young Artist Award and nominated once for The Hollywood Reporter YoungStar Award. He found it difficult coping with his newfound fame, citing at least one breakdown at 15 when he was on a "Sail With the Stars" charity cruise. However, in a later interview, Strong also stated that he was inconsiderate with his power, having previously set up weekly six hour roundtrip commutes back to Sonoma with his mother and brother.

Strong permanently moved to Los Angeles at 16 and later attended morning classes at Occidental College. After Boy Meets World ended in 2000, he moved to New York to attend Columbia University. At that time, actors Joseph Gordon-Levitt, Julia Stiles, and Anna Paquin were all registered students at the university. Strong took one semester off to star as Paul in the indie horror film Cabin Fever (2002), directed by Eli Roth. He took another semester off to star in a Broadway production of The Graduate, opposite Jerry Hall as Mrs. Robinson.

In 2006, he returned to television for a regular series role in Pepper Dennis on The WB. The show was short-lived and was not chosen as one of the transferring shows to The CW. That same year, Strong recorded a reading for the audio version of the Anthony Kiedis biography, Scar Tissue. He had a brief cameo appearance in 2009's Cabin Fever 2: Spring Fever, the sequel to Cabin Fever.

Along with his brother, Shiloh Strong, he wrote and directed the short film, Irish Twins, which premiered at the 2008 Tribeca Film Festival. It went on to win both the Jury Award and Audience Award at the Woods Hole Film Festival, a Special Jury Prize in the Action/Cut Short Film Competition and Best First-Time Director at DC Shorts. Speaking to Pure Movies in 2010 he expressed that he wanted to expand his writing and directing career: "Acting is always there and I enjoy it but it's kind of got a little unfulfilling lately. You know, I'm in the low budget horror world. ... I have a whole lot of other stuff I want to do." 

In 2010, Strong starred in the science fiction-thriller film Darkening Sky alongside Ezra Buzzington, Charley Rossman, Sally Berman, Daniel Kirschner and LaShan Anderson under the direction of Victor Bornia. He also appeared in Your Lucky Day which premiered at the Seattle International Film Festival that same year.

In late 2012, Strong declined an offer to reprise his role as Shawn Hunter in the spinoff, Girl Meets World. However, during production of the pilot in March 2013, Strong along with other cast members, who were also unconfirmed to return, appeared on the set sparking rumors of a cameo or return to the new series. Creator Michael Jacobs stated "I think there's more than a chance, I think there's a strong chance" when commenting on Strong and other original series cast members returning. Other current cast members commented on Strong's return indicating that his return might be a secret not ready to be revealed. In June 2013, a Boy Meets World reunion was held with Strong attending along with many of his former cast members. On March 19, 2014, it was confirmed that Strong would reprise his role as Shawn Hunter, the first being a holiday-themed episode along with former cast members Betsy Randle and William Russ. He has managed to leverage his reprisal of Shawn on the condition that he and his brother would get to direct a few episodes.

In March 2012, Strong, Julia Pistell, and Tod Goldberg, started Literary Disco, a podcast about books and writing. In September 2019, Strong debuted Never Ever Land, his play inspired by the 1993 child sexual abuse accusations against Michael Jackson, in Los Angeles.

He has hosted the Boy Meets World rewatch podcast Pod Meets World with Danielle Fishel and Will Friedle since 2022.

Personal life
Strong began dating actress Alexandra Barreto after they met while filming the 2006 television series Pepper Dennis. They became engaged in December 2012, and married on October 20, 2013, in Oregon. The couple have one son, Indigo "Indy" Barreto Strong, born in December 2014.

In April 2008, Strong, along with Barreto and his brother Shiloh, co-created a 30-second television ad in support of Democratic presidential candidate Barack Obama titled, "It Could Happen to You". The ad, submitted to MoveOn, became one of 15 finalists from a pool of over 1,100 submitted ads, and was chosen as the funniest ad in May 2008. In August, MoveOn raised $200,000 to air the ad on MTV and Comedy Central; it was the first political commercial to ever appear on Comedy Central. In early 2009, Strong narrated the audiobook of The Obama Revolution by Alan Kennedy-Shaffer. In 2018 and 2019, he was seen attending the Women's March, March for Public Education in Los Angeles, and March for Our Lives.

Filmography

Awards and nominations

References

External links

 Literary Disco on Apple Podcasts
 
 
 

1979 births
Living people
American people of English descent
American people of Irish descent
American male child actors
American male film actors
American male screenwriters
American male television actors
American male voice actors
American television directors
Bennington College alumni
Columbia College (New York) alumni
Film directors from California
Film producers from California
Male actors from the San Francisco Bay Area
Screenwriters from California
Writers from the San Francisco Bay Area
20th-century American male actors
21st-century American male actors